This table displays the top-rated primetime television series of the 1975–76 season as measured by Nielsen Media Research.

References

1975 in American television
1976 in American television
1975-related lists
1976-related lists
Lists of American television series